Kilbourne may refer to:

Places

United States
 Kilbourne, Illinois
 Kilbourne, Louisiana
 Kilbourne, Ohio

United Kingdom
 Kilburn, Derbyshire, historically also spelled Kilbourne

Other uses
 Kilbourne (DJ)
 Kilbourne (surname)
 Kilbourne High School, high school in Columbus, Ohio